The following is a list of notable deaths in March 2002.

Entries for each day are listed alphabetically by surname. A typical entry lists information in the following sequence:
 Name, age, country of citizenship at birth, subsequent country of citizenship (if applicable), reason for notability, cause of death (if known), and reference.

March 2002

1
John Blume, 92, American structural engineer, known as "the father of earthquake engineering".
C. Farris Bryant, 87, American Governor (34th Governor of Florida from 1961 to 1965).
Dino Casanova, 35, American professional wrestler, heart attack.
John Challens, 86, British scientist and civil servant, helped develop Britain's first atomic bomb.
Barbara Davies, 46, English teacher and peace campaigner (Christian Campaign for Nuclear Disarmament).
Marion Flanagan, 77, American football player.
David Mann, 85, American songwriter.
Henry H. "Hank" Price, 86, American politician.
Bob Smith, 76, American professional football player (Brooklyn Dodgers, Detroit Lions).
Hocine Soltani, 29, Algerian boxer, murdered.
Doreen Waddell, 36, British soul singer (Soul II Soul).
Roger Plumpton Wilson, 96, British Anglican prelate.

2
Andrés Archila, 88, Guatemalan violinist and music conductor.
 Bill Berg, 84, American animator.
Jeanne Burbank, 86, American scientist in the field of electrochemistry.
Alvin Eicoff, 80, American advertising executive, widely recognized as a founder of direct response television advertising.
Friedrich Gorenstein, 69, Russian-Jewish author and screenwriter.
Don Haig, 68, Canadian filmmaker, editor, and producer.
Ellis L. Perry, 82, American vice admiral.
Fritz-Rudolf Schultz, 85, German World War II army officer and politician.
Alexei Yegorov, 26, Russian professional ice hockey player (San Jose Sharks), beaten.

3
Henry Nathaniel Andrews, 91, American paleobotanist, recognized as an expert on the Devonian and Carboniferous periods.
G. M. C. Balayogi, 50, Indian lawyer and politician.
Calvin Carrière, 80, American fiddler.
Marvin E. Frankel, 81, American judge (United States district judge of the United States District Court for the Southern District of New York).
Harlan Howard, 74, American country music songwriter ("I Fall to Pieces", "Busted", "Heartaches By The Number", "Why Not Me").
Al Pollard, 73, American professional football player (Army, New York Yanks, Philadelphia Eagles) and broadcaster, lymphoma.
Roy Porter, 55, British historian and writer, known for his work on the history of medicine.

4
Eric Flynn, 62, British actor and singer (Ivanhoe, The Caesars, Freewheelers).
Bernard Matemera, 56, Zimbabwean sculptor.
Ernest Mercier, 88, Canadian  agronomist and deputy minister.
Elyne Mitchell, 88,  Australian author
Prunella Ransome, 59, English actress.
Velibor Vasović, 62, Serbian footballer and manager, heart attack.
Thomas Michael Whalen III, 68, American attorney and politician (three-term mayor of Albany), car accident.

5
Howard Cannon, 90, American politician (U.S. Senator from Nevada from 1959 to 1983).
Péter Kiss, 65, Hungarian mathematician.
Frances Macdonald, 87, English painter.
William Nagle, 54, Australian soldier, author, actor, and screenwriter.
Huang Shun-hsing, 78, Taiwanese politician, heart attack.
Clay Smith, 87, American baseball player (Cleveland Indians, Detroit Tigers).
Surendra Jha 'Suman', 91, Indian poet, writer, publisher and politician, heart failure.
Harry Wingfield, 91, English illustrator, known for his drawings for the Key Words Reading Scheme.

6
Piet Bannenberg, 91, Dutch Olympic swimmer (men's 4 × 200 metre freestyle relay at the 1928 Summer Olympics).
Alice Bauer, 74, American professional golfer, one of the founders of the LPGA.
Chuck Chapman, 90, Canadian Olympic basketball player (silver medal winner in basketball at the 1936 Summer Olympics).
Eddie Flynn, 82, Irish football player.
Bryan Fogarty, 32, Canadian professional ice hockey player (Quebec Nordiques, Pittsburgh Penguins, Montreal Canadiens), enlarged heart.
David Jenkins, 89, Welsh librarian.
Dietrich Schmidt, 82, German Luftwaffe night fighter ace during World War II.
Donald Wilson, 91, British television writer and producer (The Forsyte Saga, Doctor Who).
Ernie Williamson, 79, American professional football player (Washington Redskins, New York Giants, Los Angeles Dons).

7
Geoff Charles, 93, Welsh photojournalist.
Troy Graham, 52, American professional wrestler, heart attack.
Mickey Haslin, 92, American baseball player (Philadelphia Phillies, Boston Bees, New York Giants).
Mati Klarwein, 69, German painter, cancer.
Franziska Rochat-Moser, 35, Swiss marathon runner (1997 New York City Marathon winner, Olympic women's marathon: 1992, 1996).
Shelley Smith Mydans, 86, American novelist, journalist and prisoner of war.
Charles H. Wright, 83, American physician, founder of the Charles H. Wright Museum of African American History.

8
Al Bonniwell, 90, American professional basketball player (Akron Firestone Non-Skids).
George F. Carrier, 83, American mathematician.
Bill Johnson, 85, American football player (University of Minnesota, Green Bay Packers).
Ellert Sölvason, 84, Icelandic football player.
Ted Sepkowski, 78, American baseball player (Cleveland Indians, New York Yankees).

9
Jack Baer, 87, American baseball coach.
Mary Elmes, 93, Irish aid worker credited who saved over 200 Jewish children during World War II.
Hamish Henderson, 82, Scottish poet.
Vinko Kandija, 67, Croatian handball player and coach.
Bora Spužić Kvaka, 67, Serbian vocalist and recording artist.
Carlos Casares Mouriño, 60, Spanish Galician language writer, cardiac arrest.
Irene Worth, 85, American actress (Tiny Alice, Sweet Bird of Youth, Lost in Yonkers), Tony winner (1965, 1976, 1991).

10
Irán Eory, 64, Iranian-Mexican actress, Intracerebral hemorrhage.
George Fix, 62, American mathematician, considered one of the world's pre-eminent applied mathematicians, cancer.
Genevieve Fiore, 90, American women's rights and peace activist.
Gilmore Schjeldahl, 89, American businessman.
Shirley Scott, 67, American jazz organist, heart failure.
Howard Thompson, 82, American journalist and film critic, pneumonia.

11
Al Cowens, 50, American baseball player (Kansas City Royals, California Angels, Detroit Tigers, Seattle Mariners), heart attack.
Marion Dönhoff, 92, German journalist and publisher of Die Zeit, known as a leading journalist opposed to Hitler.
Genevieve George, 74, American baseball player (AAGPBL).
Rudolf Hell, 100, German inventor and manufacturer.
Pervez Iqbal, 26, Pakistani cricketer, pollen allergy.
Willibald Jentschke, 90, Austrian-German nuclear physicist.
Franjo Kuharić, 82, Croatian Catholic cardinal, cardiac arrest.
Herbert Spencer, 77, British designer, writer and photographer.
James Tobin, 84, American economist.

12
Peter Blau, 84, American sociologist.
Steve Gromek, 82, American baseball player (Cleveland Indians, Detroit Tigers).
Spyros Kyprianou, 69, 2nd President of Cyprus.
Rose Mandel, 91, Polish-born American photographer.
Jean-Paul Riopelle, 78, Canadian painter and sculptor.

13
Rovshan Aliyev, Azerbaijani criminalist, murdered.
Hans-Georg Gadamer, 102, German philosopher.
Lou Kahn, 86, American baseball player, manager, scout and coach.
Alice du Pont Mills, 89, American aviator.
Hubert Wagner, 61, Polish volleyball player and coach (men's volleyball at the 1968 Summer Olympics).

14
Kevin Danaher, 89, Irish folklorist and author on Irish traditional customs and beliefs.
M. J. Perera, 87, Sri Lankan civil servant.
Leon L. Van Autreve, 82, US Army Sergeant Major.
Cherry Wilder, 71, New Zealand writer.
Thomas Winship, 81, American newspaper editor of the Boston Globe from 1965 until 1984.
Henry Woods, 83, American judge (U.S. District Judge of the U.S. District Court for the Eastern District of Arkansas).

15
Tamala Krishna Goswami, 55, member of this body since its beginnings, car accident.
Rand Holmes, 60, Canadian artist and illustrator, Hodgkin's lymphoma.
Marshall Leib, 63, American singer, heart attack.
Pat Weaver, 93, American television executive, credited with creating Today, Tonight, Home, Wide Wide World.
Jairo Zulbarán, 32, Colombian football player, murdered.

16
Carmelo Bene, 64, Italian actor, director and screenwriter.
Isaías Duarte Cancino, 63, Colombian Catholic priest and archbishop, killed by the FARC.
Sir Marcus Fox, 74, British politician (Member of Parliament for Shipley).
Umar Kayam, 69, Indonesian sociologist and writer.
Kid Azteca, 88, Mexican boxer.
Danilo Stojković, 67, Serbian actor.

17
Arthur Altschul, 81, American banker.
Lefty Bertrand, 93, American baseball player (Philadelphia Phillies).
Elizabeth Cadbury-Brown, 79, American-British architect (Royal College of Art, World's End housing development).
Bill Davis, 60, American football coach.
Ernest E. Debs, 98, American politician, California State Assembly (1942–1947), L.A. County Supervisor (1958–1974).
Rajammal P. Devadas, 82, Indian nutritionist and educator.
Văn Tiến Dũng, 84, Vietnamese general in the People's Army of Vietnam (PAVN).
Rosetta LeNoire, 90, American actress (Family Matters, The Sunshine Boys, Brewster's Millions).
Luise Rinser, 90, German writer.
Paul Runyan, 93, American professional golfer (two-time PGA Championship winner and a member of the World Golf Hall of Fame).
William Witney, 86, American film and television director, known as a "B" movie action director.

18
Don Betourne, 87, American professional basketball player and coach (Kankakee Gallagher Trojans).
Reginald Covill, 96, British cricketer.
Marcel Denis, 79, Belgian comic artist (Tif et Tondu).
Maude Farris-Luse, 115, American supercentenarian.
R. A. Lafferty, 87, American science fiction writer.
Gösta Winbergh, 58, Swedish operatic tenor.

19
Anne-Lisa Amadou, 72, Norwegian writer and translator.
John Patton, 66, American jazz, blues and R&B musician, complications from diabetes.
Erkki Salmenhaara, 61, Finnish composer and musicologist.
Nelson Ikon Wu, 82, Chinese and American professor of Asian art history, cancer.

20
Samuel Warren Carey, 90, Australian geologist, an early advocate of continental drift.
Eugene Figg, 65, American structural engineer, award-winning designer of dozens of bridges (Sunshine Skyway Bridge).
John E. Gray, 95, American educational administrator, President of Lamar University.
Ivan Novikoff, 102, Russian-American premier ballet master (among his students were Robert Joffrey and Gerald Arpino).
Ibn al-Khattab, 32, Saudi Arabian terrorist, Mujahid Emir, poisoned.
Richard Robinson, 51, English cricketer.

21
David E. Blackmer, 75, American audio engineer, known as the inventor of the DBX noise reduction system and founder of dbx.
James F. Blake, 89, American bus driver, antagonist for the Montgomery bus boycott.
Samuel De Palma, 83, American public servant, Assistant Secretary of State for International Affairs.
Ernest van den Haag, 87, Dutch-American sociologist, social critic, and author.
Thomas Flanagan, 78, American professor and novelist.
Herman Talmadge, 88, American politician.

22
Sir Kingsford Dibela, 70, Governor-General of Papua New Guinea.
Hugh R. Stephen, 88, Canadian politician.
Josef von Stroheim, 79, American sound editor, lung cancer.
Harry Worton, 81, Canadian politician.

23
John Biby, 90, American Olympic sailor (gold medal winner in 8 metre sailing at the 1932 Summer Olympics).
Richard Bradford, 69, American novelist (Red Sky at Morning, So Far from Heaven).
Jack Doolan, 82, American professional football player (Georgetown, New York Giants, Chicago Cardinals).
Eileen Farrell, 82, American soprano, performed both classical and popular music.
Piara Singh Gill, 90, Indian nuclear physicist.
Ben Hollioake, 24, Australian cricketer, car crash.
Marcel Kint, 87, Belgian bicycle racer.
Neal E. Miller, 92, American psychologist.
Minnie Rojas, 68, Cuban-American baseball player (California Angels).
Richard Sylbert, 73, American film production designer and art director (Who's Afraid of Virginia Woolf?, Dick Tracy, Chinatown), Oscar winner (1967, 1991), cancer.

24
Dick Bittner, 80, American professional ice hockey player (Boston Bruins).
Beverly Bower, 76, American operatic soprano (New York City Opera, Metropolitan Opera).
Mace Brown, 92, American baseball player (Pittsburgh Pirates, Brooklyn Dodgers, Boston Red Sox).<ref>{{cite news |author1= |author-link1= |title=Mace Brown, 92, Pitcher Who Gave Up Hartnett's 'Homer in the Gloamin |url=https://www.nytimes.com/2002/03/28/sports/mace-brown-92-pitcher-who-gave-up-hartnett-s-homer-in-the-gloamin.html |url-access=subscription |access-date=8 August 2021 |work=The New York Times |date=28 March 2002 |page=A 28}}</ref>
Dorothy DeLay, 84, American violin instructor, teacher of many of the world's leading violinists.
Doug Demmings, 50, American middleweight professional boxer.
César Milstein, 74, Argentinian biochemist.
Frank G. White, 92, American army general.

25
James E. Bolin, 87, American jurist and politician.
Maurice Braverman, 86, American civil rights lawyer, pneumonia.
Ronald Verlin Cassill, 82, American writer, editor, painter and lithographer.
Ken Traill, 75, British rugby league player.
Kenneth Wolstenholme, 81, British football commentator.
Hilde Zimmermann, 81, member of the Austrian Resistance during WWII.

26
Elaine Anderson, 66, American paleontologist.
Roy Calvert, 88, New Zealand World War II air force officer.
Randy Castillo, 51, American musician, Ozzy Osbourne drummer (mid-1980s to early 1990s) and Mötley Crüe drummer (1999 to 2002).
Hugh Davis Graham, 65, American historian, sociologist, civil rights scholar and author.
Louis M. Heyward, 81, American producer and film and television writer (The Ernie Kovacs Show, Winky Dink and You), pneumonia.
Gerald Hylkema, 56, Dutch footballer.
Ray Kemp, 94, American footballer.
Eugen Meier, 71, Swiss footballer.
Chaike Belchatowska Spiegel, 81, Polish resistance fighter.
Whitey Wietelmann, 83, American baseball player (Boston Bees/Braves, Pittsburgh Pirates) and coach.

27
Milton Berle, 93, American comedian dubbed "Uncle Miltie" and "Mr. Television" (Texaco Star Theater, The Milton Berle Show).
Sir Louis Matheson, 90, British university administrator, Vice Chancellor of Monash University.
Dudley Moore, 66, British actor and writer (Foul Play, 10, Arthur).
Tadeusz Rut, 70, Polish Olympic hammer thrower.
Billy Wilder, 95, Austrian-born American film director and screenwriter (Double Indemnity, The Apartment, Some Like It Hot''), six-time Oscar winner.

28
Clarence B. Craft, 80, U.S. Army soldier and a recipient of the Medal of Honor.
Clark Jones, 81, American television director.
Tikka Khan, 86, Pakistani army general.
F. N. Souza, 77, British artist.
Albert Whitford, 96, American physicist and astronomer, dean of modern photoelectric photometry.

29
John Cameron, 84, Australian baritone opera singer, became known for his portrayal of characters in modern operas.
James T. Cushing, 65, American professor of physics, philosophy, and the history and philosophy of science.
Difang Duana, 81, Taiwanese farmer and folk musician, sepsis.
Franklin S. Forsberg, 96, American publisher and diplomat (U.S. Ambassador to Sweden).
John Thomas Idlet, 71, American Beat poet, congestive heart failure.
Yuliya Kolosovskaya, 81, Russian historian.
Rico Yan, 27, Filipino model, film and television actor, acute pancreatitis.

30
Anand Bakshi, 71, Indian poet and lyricist.
Yara Bernette, 82, Brazilian classical pianist, heart attack.
John Brennan Crutchley, 55, American kidnapper and rapist, autoerotic asphyxiation.
Queen Elizabeth The Queen Mother, 101, British consort of King George VI.
Alfie Stokes, 69, British footballer.

31
Lady Anne Brewis, 91, English botanist.
William F. Cassidy, 93, commanding officer in the US Army.
David Holt, 76, British psychotherapist.
Laren Renee Sims, 36, American criminal, suicide by hanging.
Lucio San Pedro, 89, Filipino composer and teacher, cardiac arrest.
Barry Took, 73, English writer, television presenter and comedian.

References 

2002-03
 03